Riccarda Mazzotta (born 8 June 1986) is a Swiss professional racing cyclist. She rides for the Servetto Footon team.

See also
 List of 2015 UCI Women's Teams and riders

References

External links

1986 births
Living people
Swiss female cyclists
Place of birth missing (living people)